The 2022 Brentwood Borough Council election took place on 5 May 2022 to elect members of Brentwood Borough Council in England. This was on the same day as other local elections.

Results summary

Ward results

Results of the Borough Council election were announced on 6 May 2022.

Brentwood North

Brentwood South

Brentwood West

Brizes & Doddinghurst

Herongate, Ingrave & West Horndon

Hutton Central

Hutton East

Hutton South

Ingatestone, Fryerning & Mountnessing

Pilgrims Hatch

Shenfield

South Weald

Warley

References

2022
Brentwood